Kshetrapala is a guardian deity featured in Indian religions. According to Hindu mythology, a kshetrapala is the guardian deity of a consecrated land or farmland. Kshetrapala became a generic name applied to deities associated with a piece or parcel of land, or a particular region.

Description
Kshetrapalas are generally found in South India. Their shrines are commonly present in the north-east corner of a village or a town. Associated with the deity Bhairava, they are portrayed in the nude and accompanied by a dog. They are depicted with three or six eyes, and an even number of hands, which are regarded to be representative of different gunas. They possess fangs in their mouths and wear a sacred thread composed of snakes. They carry a sword and a shield, and are often featured with Shaiva iconography.

See also
 Dharmapala
 Dikpala
 Ayyanar

References

Sources
Dictionary of Hindu Lore and Legend by Anna Dallapiccola

Hindu gods
Buddhist gods